Brett Carter (born 9 July 1988) is a Scotland international rugby league footballer who plays on the  or  for Barrow Raiders in the Betfred Championship.

Background
Carter was born in Barrow-in-Furness, Cumbria, England.

Career

Barrow Raiders
Carter started his career in his hometown with Barrow before moving to Workington Town in 2009.

Whitehaven RLFC
On 27 November 2019 it was announced that Carter had joined Whitehaven R.L.F.C.

International
He is a Scotland international having made his début in 2010. He was named in their squad for the 2013 Rugby League World Cup, and scored a try in their opening victory over Tonga.

References

External links

(archived by web.archive.org) Workington Town profile

1989 births
Living people
Barrow Raiders players
Cumbria rugby league team players
English rugby league players
English people of Scottish descent
Rugby league fullbacks
Rugby league players from Barrow-in-Furness
Scotland national rugby league team players
Whitehaven R.L.F.C. players
Workington Town players